Aleksandra Srndovic (born 18 November 1982) is a Swedish former professional tennis player.

Srndovic twice featured in the doubles main draw of the Nordic Light Open, in 2007 and 2008, both partnering Debbrich Feys. She has been a squad member of the Sweden Fed Cup team.

ITF finals

Singles: 3 (2–1)

Doubles: 13 (6–7)

References

External links
 
 

1982 births
Living people
Swedish female tennis players
20th-century Swedish women
21st-century Swedish women